Syd Smith may refer to:

 Syd Smith (association footballer) (1895–?), played for Derby County, Norwich City and Gillingham in the 1920s
 Syd Smith (Australian rules footballer) (1888–1954), played for Fitzroy in 1919
 Syd Smith (baseball) (1883–1961), American baseball player
 Sydney Ure Smith (1887–1949), Australian artist and publisher

See also
 Sid Smith (disambiguation)